Ross Cunningham (born 23 May 1998) is a Scottish professional footballer who plays for Clyde as a forward.

Early life
Cunningham was born in Livingston, West Lothian, Scotland.

Club career
Having been with the club as a youth player for several years, Cunningham made his senior debut for Hamilton Academical on 14 May 2016. He signed a new two-year contract with Accies later that month.

Cunningham was loaned to Scottish League One club Forfar Athletic in September 2018. He scored a goal on his debut appearance for Forfar, in a 3–1 defeat to Arbroath on 15 September. He returned to Hamilton in January 2019, then suffered an ankle injury which ruled him out for the rest of the season. In June 2019 he signed a contract extension with Hamilton, until summer 2020.

He scored his first goals for the club in the early-season group stage of the 2019–20 Scottish League Cup, then registered his first in the Scottish Premiership with a late penalty to secure a 2–1 win over Livingston.

On 5 February 2020, Cunningham moved on loan to Clyde for the remainder of the season.

Cunningham left Hamilton in August 2020, after 11 years with the club. In September 2020 he returned to Clyde on a permanent contract.

International career
Cunningham was selected for Scotland training squads at under-14 level in 2012, and made three appearances at under-15 level in 2013.

Career statistics

References

1998 births
Living people
Scottish footballers
Hamilton Academical F.C. players
Forfar Athletic F.C. players
Clyde F.C. players
Scottish Professional Football League players
Association football forwards
Scotland youth international footballers